Penstemon purpusii is an uncommon species of penstemon known by the common name Snow Mountain beardtongue. It is endemic to northern California, where it is known only from the Klamath Mountains and northern peaks of the North Coast Ranges. It grows in rocky open and forested mountain habitat. It is a perennial herb growing to a maximum height of 20 centimeters from a woody base. The leaves are 1 to 3 centimeters long, widely lance-shaped and sometimes folded lengthwise. The glandular inflorescence bears tubular flowers up to 3 centimeters long. They are generally purple-blue in color, often with white throats.

External links
Jepson Manual Treatment
Photo gallery

purpusii
Endemic flora of California
Flora without expected TNC conservation status